Great fire of 1917 may refer to:

 Great Thessaloniki Fire of 1917
Great Atlanta fire of 1917